Ralph Henry Byrne (25 April 1877 – 15 April 1946) was an Irish architect. He was the third but second surviving son of William Henry Byrne.

Early life and education
He was born in Largo House, Rathmines, Dublin on 25 April 1877. He was educated at home and at St George's College, Weybridge.

Career
He was articled to his father under an indenture date 1 April 1896. He spent six months apprenticed to Thomas Edward Marshall of Harrogate and went into partnership with his father on 10 April 1902. His father became blind in 1913 then died on 28 April 1917. After his father's death Ralph kept trading as W.H.Byrne and son.

His assistants and students included Arnold Francis Hendy, Sheila Tindal and Guy Hemingway Yeoman.

Personal life
He married Mary Josephine Mangan of Dunboyne Castle on 21 November 1905. They had one son, Frank William Barrett Mangan Byrne, who was born in 1910 and became a Captain in the Royal Irish Fusiliers. He died on 30 May 1940.

Death
He died in his home at 9 Ailesbury Road on 15 April 1946. His widow died in 1957.

References

External links
Archiseek page on Ralph Henry Byrne

19th-century Irish architects
20th-century Irish architects
1877 births
1946 deaths